Kurt Max Runte is a Canadian actor based in Vancouver, British Columbia. He is most noted for his performance as Dale Milbury in the 2016 film Hello Destroyer, for which he won the Vancouver Film Critics Circle award for Best Supporting Actor in a Canadian Film at the Vancouver Film Critics Circle Awards 2016.

Originally from Wetaskiwin, Alberta, Runte began his acting career in Edmonton after graduating from the theatre program at the University of Victoria. Primarily a stage actor, his roles have included productions of D.D. Kugler's The Monument for Northern Light Theatre, Brian Drader's The Fruit Machine for the Out West Performance Society, William Shakespeare's Hamlet and Alan Ayckbourn's Communicating Doors for the Stanley Theatre, François Archambault's The Winners for the Firehall Arts Centre, and Patrick Marber's Closer for Western Conspiracy Theatre. He was a Jessie Richardson Theatre Award nominee for Best Actor in 2000 for The Winners.

He has also had supporting roles in film and television, including in Kevan Funk's short films Yellowhead and Bison, and a recurring role as Jason Breen in Kyle XY. He is a two-time Leo Award nominee for Best Supporting Actor in a Film, receiving nominations in 2003 for Little Brother of War and in 2017 for Hello Destroyer.

Filmography

References

External links

20th-century Canadian male actors
21st-century Canadian male actors
Canadian male film actors
Canadian male stage actors
Canadian male television actors
Male actors from Alberta
Male actors from Vancouver
People from Wetaskiwin
University of Victoria alumni
Year of birth missing (living people)
Living people